Liviu Gabriel Huiban is a Romanian songwriter, keyboardist, arranger,   and composer of numerous scores for the advertising industry, radio, television and motion pictures.
 
In 20 years of activity, he had been writing for more than 60 artists, renowned or beginners, assembling a 400 song portfolio from which 50 reached Top 15 charts.  
 
He established an enduring collaboration in Romania with the music band DJ Project. They began working together in 2005 and released 10 hit-singles that reached Top 5 and 6 of them make it to No. 1 on the charts.
 
Huiban has worked with artists such as Akcent, Andreea Banica, Marius Nedelcu, Giulia, Ryan & Radu, Heaven, Markus Schulz, Alexandra Stan, Elena Gheorghe, CRBL, Delia,  Anna Lesko and many more.

References

Year of birth missing (living people)
Living people
People from Bârlad
Romanian songwriters
Romanian record producers
Place of birth missing (living people)
Date of birth missing (living people)